Rhadinoloricaria is a genus of catfish endemic to South America. It was considered to be monotypic until the 2020 discovery of a second species.

Rhadinoloricaria is part of the Pseudohemiodon group of the tribe Loricariini in the subfamily Loricariinae. Apistoloricaria and Crossoloricaria include fish that are very similar to Rhadinoloricaria, and it has been proposed that the former two genera be synonymized with the latter.

Species 
There are currently two recognized species:

 Rhadinoloricaria macromystax 
 Rhadinoloricaria stewarti

References

Loricariini
Taxa named by Isaäc J. H. Isbrücker
Taxa named by Han Nijssen
Catfish genera